Motel Shot is a studio album by Delaney & Bonnie and Friends, released in 1971. The album, their third for Atco/Atlantic (catalog no. SD 33-358) and fifth overall, is a mostly acoustic set. The album's title refers to the impromptu, sometimes late-night, jam sessions pursued by touring musicians when on the road.

In the liner notes, Delaney Bramlett dedicates the album to "My mom who sang alto." Bonnie Bramlett wrote "If this album can make one person feel half of what I felt on this session, then I am happy. It is to all of you with love."

The album reached #65 on the Billboard album chart, and includes Delaney and Bonnie's biggest chart single, "Never Ending Song of Love", which peaked at #13. "Never Ending Song of Love" would immediately become a popular tune to cover, with hit versions being recorded by The New Seekers and Dickey Lee at the same time as Delaney & Bonnie's version (each becoming a hit in different markets) and the Osmond Brothers having a minor hit with it a decade later.

Guest musicians on the album include Leon Russell, Joe Cocker, Duane Allman, Dave Mason, John Hartford, Clarence White, Gram Parsons and Bobby Whitlock.

Track listing
"Where the Soul Never Dies" (Traditional) – 3:24
"Will the Circle Be Unbroken" (A. P. Carter) – 2:42
"Rock of Ages" (Traditional) – 2:17
"Long Road Ahead" (Delaney Bramlett, Bonnie Bramlett, Carl Radle) – 3:25
"Faded Love" (Bob Wills, Johnnie Wills) – 4:03
"Talkin' about Jesus" (Traditional) – 6:51
"Come On In My Kitchen" (Robert Johnson) – 2:41
"Don't Deceive Me (Please Don't Go)" (Chuck Willis) – 3:54
"Never Ending Song of Love" (Delaney Bramlett) – 3:20
"Sing My Way Home" (Delaney Bramlett) – 4:02
"Goin' Down the Road Feelin' Bad" (Traditional, Delaney Bramlett) – 5:12
"Lonesome and a Long Way from Home" (Delaney Bramlett, Bonnie Bramlett, Leon Russell) – 3:55

Note that original pressings of the album credit "Come On In My Kitchen" not to Robert Johnson but to "Payne", a pseudonym under which some of Johnson's music was published at the time. (Original pressings of The Rolling Stones' 1969 album Let It Bleed credit Johnson's song "Love in Vain" in similar manner).

Personnel
Delaney Bramlett – guitar, vocals, arranger
Bonnie Bramlett – vocals
Duane Allman – slide guitar (tracks 7, 10–11)
Ben Benay – guitar
Kenny Gradney – bass guitar
John Hartford – banjo, fiddle
Eddie James – guitar
Jim Keltner – drums
Bobby Keys – saxophone
Dave Mason – guitar
Gram Parsons – guitar, vocals
Carl Radle – bass guitar
Joe Cocker – backing vocals on 'Where The Soul Never Dies' and 'Talkin' about Jesus'
Leon Russell – piano, keyboards, vocals
Clarence White – guitar, vocals
Bobby Whitlock – vocals
Jay York – backing vocals
Johnny Bramlett – Samsonite Briefcase

Production
Producer: Delaney Bramlett
Recording engineers: Bruce Botnick, Richard Moore, Lewis Peters
Art direction: n/a
Photography: Barry Feinstein
Liner notes: Tom Wilkes

References 

Delaney & Bonnie albums
1971 albums
Albums produced by Delaney Bramlett
Atco Records albums
Country rock albums by American artists
Folk rock albums by American artists